The Taekwondo competition at the 2010 Central American and Caribbean Games was held in Mayagüez, Puerto Rico. 

The tournament was scheduled to be held from 27–29 July at the Wilfredo Toro Field at Porta del Sol.

Medal summary

Men's events

Women's events

External links

2010 in taekwondo
Events at the 2010 Central American and Caribbean Games
2010